Christopher Ronald Ketter (born 12 February 1961) is a former Australian politician who represented Queensland for the Australian Labor Party in the Australian Senate from 1 July 2014, elected at the 2013 election, until 30 June 2019.

Ketter is linked with the conservative Shop, Distributive and Allied Employees Association (SDA). Ketter was one of only two Labor Senators (along with Helen Polley) to vote against the Marriage Amendment (Definition and Religious Freedoms) Act 2017, which legalised same-sex marriage in Australia. Ketter was placed second on Labor's Queensland Senate ticket at the 2019 federal election and failed to get re-elected, after the party suffered a swing against it to the Liberal National Party, One Nation and the Greens. His term expired on 30 June 2019.

References

External links
 Parliamentary Profile
 Summary of parliamentary voting for Senator Chris Ketter on TheyVoteForYou.org.au

1961 births
Living people
Australian Labor Party members of the Parliament of Australia
Labor Right politicians
Members of the Australian Senate for Queensland
Members of the Australian Senate
Australian trade unionists
University of Queensland alumni
21st-century Australian politicians